Lieutenant General Sir Richard Hull Swinburn KCB (30 October 1937 – 11 October 2017) was Commander of the UK Field Army.

Military career
Educated at Wellington College and the Royal Military College, Sandhurst, Swinburn was commissioned into the 17th/21st Lancers in 1957. He became Commanding Officer of 17th/21st Lancers in 1979 and Commander of 7th Armoured Brigade in 1983. He went on to be General Officer Commanding 1st Armoured Division in 1987 and Assistant Chief of the General Staff in 1989. He was made GOC South East District in 1990 (which was retitled 'Southern District' in 1992). He was then made Commander UK Field Army in 1994 and retired in 1995.

He was given the colonelcy of the Queen's Royal Lancers from 1995 to 2001.

Family
He was the son of Major-General Henry Robinson Swinburn (1897–1981) and Naomi Hull (1903–1992). His maternal grandfather was Major-General Sir Charles Hull and his uncle was Field Marshal Sir Richard Hull. In 1964 he married Jane Elise Brodie who died in 2001. In September 2012, it was announced that he was engaged to Susan Ferguson (née Deptford), the widow of Major Ronald Ferguson and the stepmother of Sarah, Duchess of York. They married in December 2012. Prince Andrew, Sarah, Duchess of York, and their two daughters attended Sir Richard and Lady Swinburn's wedding celebrations.

References

|-

|-
 

|-
 

1937 births
2017 deaths
Graduates of the Royal Military College, Sandhurst
People educated at Wellington College, Berkshire
Knights Commander of the Order of the Bath
British Army generals
17th/21st Lancers officers
People from Dummer, Hampshire